Overnight Success is a 1975 studio album containing the works of Neil Sedaka. It was released in the UK and throughout Europe on the Polydor label, and Australia on the Rainbow label. Later that same year, in the US, most of this album was issued under the title The Hungry Years, with two songs from the British album replaced on the American album.

Track listing

Side one
 "Crossroads" 3:28
 "Lonely Night (Angel Face)" 3:19
 "Stephen" 4:23
 "Bad Blood" (Neil Sedaka, Phil Cody) 3:09
 "Goodman Goodbye"* 3:55 
 "Baby Blue" 3:32

(On the US album The Hungry Years, "Goodman Goodbye" is replaced with "Your Favorite Entertainer", which is 3:32 in length.)

Side two
 "The Queen of 1964"* 3:57
 "New York City Blues" 4:22
 "When You Were Lovin' Me" 4:35
 "The Hungry Years" 4:08
 "Breaking Up Is Hard to Do" (Howard Greenfield, Neil Sedaka) (ballad version) 3:21

(On the US album The Hungry Years, "The Queen of 1964" is replaced with "Tit for Tat")

Re-release

1998
All the tracks from the British album were included in the Varese Sarabande 1998 re-issue of the American album The Hungry Years; hence, although the re-issue contains the track listing of the American album, the British songs "Goodman Goodbye" and "The Queen Of 1964" were included as two of the four bonus tracks.

See also The Hungry Years

2012
In April 2012, the album Overnight Success was re-issued by BGO Records in combination with the album The Tra-La Days Are Over on CD.

Certifications

References

1975 albums
Neil Sedaka albums
Polydor Records albums